Thomas Ashley Graves Jr. (July 3, 1924 – June 17, 2016) was an American academic who was the twenty-third president of the College of William & Mary, serving from 1971 to 1985. He next served as director of the Winterthur Museum, Garden and Library from 1985 to 1992. His personal papers as well as his papers from his time as president of the College of William & Mary, are held by the Special Collections Research Center at the College of William & Mary.

References

External links
Finding aid for the Office of the President. Thomas A. Graves, Jr. Records
Finding aid for the Thomas A. Graves Papers
SCRC Wiki page for Thomas A. Graves

1924 births
2016 deaths
Harvard Business School faculty
Harvard University alumni
People from Williamsburg, Virginia
Presidents of the College of William & Mary
Stanford University faculty
Yale University alumni
People associated with Winterthur Museum, Garden and Library